Wesley Koolhof and Neal Skupski defeated Ivan Dodig and Austin Krajicek in the final, 7–6(7–5), 6–4 to win the doubles tennis title at the 2022 Paris Masters. With the win, they secured the year-end No. 1 team ranking.

Tim Pütz and Michael Venus were the defending champions, but lost in the quarterfinals to Kevin Krawietz and Andreas Mies.

Rajeev Ram and Koolhof were in contention for the ATP No. 1 doubles ranking. Koolhof secured the No. 1 spot by reaching the semifinals. Having played one fewer tournament than Neal Skupski, Koolhof will be ranked higher than the Briton at the conclusion of the tournament, despite sharing the same amount of points.

Seeds 
All seeds received a bye into the second round.

Draw

Finals

Top half

Bottom half

References

External links
Main draw

Doubles